The 2004–05 Danish Cup was the 51st version of the Danish Cup. First round was played on about July 28 and the final was played on May 5.

Brøndby IF ended as cup winner, but as they also won the Danish Superliga, the UEFA Cup-spot went to the cup runner-up FC Midtjylland.

Results
The team listed to the left, is the home team.

1st round
In first round competed 48 teams from the "series" (Denmark's series and lower 2003) and 16 teams from Danish 2nd Division 2003-04.

2nd round
In second round competed 32 winning teams from 1st round and 8 teams from Danish 1st Division 2003-04 (no. 9 to 16).

*Dalum won without match.

3rd round
In third round competed 20 winning teams from 2nd round, 6 teams from Danish 1st Division 2003-04 (no. 3 to 8) and 2 teams from Danish Superliga 2003-04 (no. 11 and 12).

4th round
In fourth round competed 14 winning teams from 3rd round, 2 teams from Danish 1st Division 2003-04 (no. 1 and 2) and 4 teams from Danish Superliga 2003-04 (no. 7 to 10).

5th round
In fifth round competed 10 winning teams from 4th round and 6 teams from Danish Superliga 2003-04 (no. 1 to 6).

Quarter finals

Semi finals
The semi finals are played on home and away basis.

Final

The final was played at Parken Stadium.

See also
 Football in Denmark
 2004–05 in Danish football
 2004–05 Danish Superliga
 2004–05 Danish 1st Division

External links
 The Danish FA's full match schedule.

Cup
2004–05 domestic association football cups
2005